Emani Biswas   is an Indian politician member of All India Trinamool Congress.  He is an MLA, elected from the Suti constituency in the 2011 West Bengal Legislative Assembly election as an Indian National Congress candidate. In 2021 assembly election he was re-elected from the same constituency as an All India Trinamool Congress candidate.

References 

Trinamool Congress politicians from West Bengal
Living people
People from Murshidabad district
West Bengal MLAs 2021–2026
Year of birth missing (living people)